Elektra is a pop rock band from Iceland formed in 2009.

History 
Elektra is an all-female band from Reykjavík. The lead singer is Nana Alfreds. Their manager is Valgeir Magnússon.

In February 2009, with the song "Got No Love", they finished third in the national selection for Eurovision Song Contest. This single was number 1 in Iceland.

Members 
 Nana: guitar, vocals
 Brynhildur: guitar, vocals
 Eva: bass guitar, vocals
 Linda: keyboards, vocals
 Dísa: drums

Discography 
Albums
 Sísí (2009)
 Cobra on Heels (2010)

Singles
 "Got no Love"
 "Sísí (Fríkar út)"
 "I Don't Do Boys"
 "Komdu Aftur"
 "Cobra on Heels"

External links 
 Elektra (www.tonlist.is)

Girl groups
Icelandic pop music groups
Icelandic women singers
Icelandic rock music groups
Musical groups established in 2009
Musical groups from Reykjavík